Azərbaycan Qızıyam is a 2015 compilation album by Aygun Kazimova, composed of songs released in her 1992–2015 albums.

Track listing

Music videos
 "Vətən Anadır"
 "Şəhidlər"
 "Azərbaycan Bayrağı"
 "Qarabağı Gözəl Gördüm"

Notes

External links
   - Aygün Kazımova Album İnfo
 Aygün Kazımova Translations
 Aygun Kazimova Fun Club

Aygün Kazımova albums
2015 compilation albums